A list of web service frameworks:

See also
 Comparison of web frameworks
 List of web service specifications
 List of web service protocols
 Web service
 Java view technologies and frameworks
 List of application servers

Web services